Don't Stop Believin': Everyman's Journey is a 2012 American documentary film of the band Journey and its new lead vocalist Arnel Pineda.

Overview
The film shows the band during the Revelation Tour in the United States and Pineda's homecoming in Manila, Philippines where they performed in front of 25,000 people.

Cast
 Neal Schon - Lead Guitar, Vocals
 Ross Valory - Bass, Vocals
 Jonathan Cain - Keyboards, Rhythm Guitar, Vocals
 Deen Castronovo - Drums, Percussion, Vocals
 Arnel Pineda - Lead Vocals
 Katherine Heigl as herself

Reception
Don't Stop Believin': Everyman's Journey received mixed to positive reviews, holding a 62% "fresh" rating on Rotten Tomatoes; the consensus states: "An energetic but thin portrait of the venerable rock band Journey, Don't Stop Believin gets a boost from new singer Arnel Pineda's charming personality." It has a 53/100 rating on Metacritic, signifying "mixed or average reviews". The film opened the 2013–2014 season of PBS's Independent Lens, where it won the Audience Award.

References

Further reading

External links
 
 
 
 

Journey (band)
2012 films
2012 documentary films
American documentary films
Rockumentaries
Filipino-language films
Films directed by Ramona S. Diaz
American independent films
2012 independent films
2010s English-language films
2010s American films